Jeonju Gymnasium is an arena in Jeonju, South Korea. It is the home arena of the Jeonju KCC Egis of the Korean Basketball League (KBL).

History
The construction of Jeonju Gymnasium began on 10 November 1969, and lasted for three years and four months, with total costs amounting to ₩246,497,000. Its opening ceremony was held on 30 March 1973, and included a basketball match between long-time rivals Korea University and Yonsei University, both based in Seoul, in which Yonsei lost with a score of 58–66. Significant remodelling and modernisation work was carried out prior to the 2011–12 KBL season, at cost of roughly ₩400 million. Major upgrades included the installation of large high-definition television screens and improvements to the lighting systems. The flooring material was originally beechwood, but it was replaced in 2013 with palmate maple.

Jeonju Gymnasium is the only large-scale indoor sports arena in the city, though there have been multiple proposals to build a second one. Despite the remodelling, public perceptions of safety issues in the gymnasium have persisted. There have also been capacity issues, with the team having to put up 300 extra chairs during the playoffs. These considerations led Egis owner KCC Corporation to consider a 2016 proposal to move the team to Suwon where they could enjoy the use of a newly-constructed stadium. In the end, pledges by Jeonju mayor  to build a new gymnasium or further remodel the existing one kept the team in Jeonju.

References

Basketball venues in South Korea
Indoor arenas in South Korea
Jeonju KCC Egis
1973 establishments in South Korea